Erasmus Montanus is a satirical play about academic snobbery set in rural Denmark. Written by Ludvig Holberg in 1722, the script was first published in 1731 and performed in 1747. Today, it is among Holberg's most frequently performed works. The play centers on its eponymous protagonist who returns to his rural village after studying in Copenhagen to find his new worldview causes conflicts in his everyday life.

History 
The script was written in 1722 and 1723, but was not published until 1731 in the 5th volume of Den Danske Skue-Plads, a collection of plays by Holberg. The play itself then did not premier until 1747. It is likely that Holberg delayed its release to avoid backlash because of the play's critical nature. The play criticises the academic profession that Holberg himself was a part of and the educational pedagogy he experienced at the University of Copenhagen as a Professor of Metaphysics. Other scholars speculate that the play's performance was delayed simply because no company cared to put the production on. When it finally premiered in 1747 it was initially unsuccessful, as its particular satirical style was no longer popular. It has since been recognised as one of Holberg's best comedies and for its important historical perspective.

Synopsis 
The play begins with Jeppe Berg in his hometown in Zealand. Jeppe receives a letter from his son, Rasmus Berg, who has been away studying in Copenhagen. Jeppe is unable to understand the letter, which had been written in Latin, and seeks out Deacon Per to translate it for him. The letter states that Rasmus will be returning home soon. 

When Rasmus returns after much anticipation he eagerly demonstrates his new knowledge. When speaking with his parents, he uses latin phrases and academic terminology. He insists that the townspeople refer to him by his Latinised name, Erasmus Montanus.  He quickly gets in to arguments with everyone he encounters, eager to "dispute". He goes on to "prove" a number of absurdities, such as relying on an argument from ignorance to prove that his mother is a rock. He is contrasted by his brother Jacob who is only interested in knowledge which is of practical application. His persistent arguing gets him into trouble with the parents of his fiancée Lisbet, who refuse to allow their daughter to marry someone who believes the Earth is round. His fiancée begs him to retract his statements that the Earth revolves around the sun, but he refuses.  

The townspeople, exhausted by Erasmus' antics, plot to get him to leave the city by tricking him into enlisting for military service. With the help of a lieutenant, he is tricked into accepting a coin, representing an enlistment bonus. Desperate to free himself from military obligations, he reconsiders his earlier arguments. Ultimately, he retracts his statement that the earth is round, declaring that "the Earth is as flat as a pancake." Thus, he is allowed to marry Lisbet.

Excerpt

Characters 
 Erasmus Montanus/Rasmus Berg: protagonist; the scholar
 Jeppe Berg: his father
 Nille: his mother
 Jacob: his brother
 Lisbet: Erasmus's fiancee
 Jeronimus: her father
 Magdelone: her Mother
 Deacon Per: parish clerk
 Jesper: The Baliff
 A Lieutenant
 Corporal Niels

Film productions and adaptations 

 Erasmus Montanus (1951)
 Erasmus Montanus (1956), directed by Ole Walbom
 Erasmus Montanus (1971), directed by Magne Bleness
 Erasmus Montanus (1973), directed by Kaspar Rostrup
 Jorden er Flad or A terra é plana (1977), directed by Henrik Stangerup

English translations

Gallery

References

External links
 Full original script (in Danish)

1722 plays
Comedy plays
Enlightenment philosophy
Plays by Ludvig Holberg
Plays set in Denmark
Danish culture
Works about classism
Works about the history of astronomy
Works about academia
Satirical plays
Danish satire